The Shire of Emerald is a former local government area in the Central Highlands region of Queensland, Australia. On 15 March 2008 the shires of Duaringa, Emerald, Bauhinia and Peak Downs were amalgamated to form the Central Highlands Region. Its administrative centre is based around Emerald.

History
The Emerald Division was separated from the Peak Downs Division on 4 June 1902.

On 31 March 1903, Emerald Division became the Shire of Emerald.

Towns and localities
The Shire of Emerald included the following settlements:

Towns:
 Bogantungan
 Comet
 Emerald
 Fernlees
 Gindee
 Withersfield
 Yamala

Gemfields area:
 Anakie
 Rubyvale
 Sapphire
 The Willows

Chairmen
 1927: W. H. Harris

References

External links
 Queensland Department of Local Government and Planning - Shire Directory
 University of Queensland: Queensland Places: Emerald Shire

Former local government areas of Queensland
2008 disestablishments in Australia
Populated places disestablished in 2008
Central Highlands Region